XHAG-FM is a radio station on 102.1 FM in Córdoba, Veracruz, Mexico. It is owned by Grupo Radio Digital and operated by Radio Comunicaciones de las Altas Montañas and carries the FM Globo romantic format from MVS Radio.

History
XEAG-AM received its concession on July 1, 1935, owned by Diodoro Zuñiga and operating on 1310 kHz. In 1948, it was sold to Luz María Zuñiga de San Miguel. By the 1960s, it was on 1280 kHz with 1,000 watts, later increased to 2,000 watts day.

XEAG moved to FM in 2010. In 2017, it flipped from Ke Buena to Stereo Joya, becoming GRD's second station with that name and format. Two years later, it transitioned to the FM Globo brand as part of a change in operator.

References

Radio stations in Veracruz
Radio stations established in 1935